The Blue Dragon is a 1919 German silent film directed by Harry Piel. It features the popular detective character Joe Deebs.

Cast
 Paul Bildt
 Heinrich Schroth as Joe Deebs

References

Bibliography

External links

1919 films
Films of the Weimar Republic
Films directed by Harry Piel
German silent feature films
German black-and-white films
1910s German films